Assignment in Brittany is a 1943 war film directed by Jack Conway and starring French actor Jean-Pierre Aumont and Swedish actress Signe Hasso, both in their American film debuts. Also starring was American actress Susan Peters.

The film was adapted from a novel by Helen MacInnes, which was serialized in The Saturday Evening Post from May 2 to June 20, 1942, and also became a bestseller when published as a book. When MGM bought the screen rights in February 1942, the novel was titled "Cross Channel". The working title of this film was "Fire in the Night".

Plot
Free French Captain Pierre Matard (Aumont) is assigned the task of locating a concealed U-boat pen in occupied France. He is chosen due to his striking resemblance to Bertrand Corlay, a suspected Nazi collaborator being held prisoner by the British.

At the Corlay family farm, Madame Henriette Corlay (Margaret Wycherly), Bertrand's mother, eventually realizes Matard is not her son, but does not give him away, although she disapproves of Bertrand's apparent cooperation with the Germans. Matard has better luck fooling both Anne Pinot (Susan Peters) and Elise (Signe Hasso), Bertrand's fiancee and mistress, respectively.

After French Resistance contact Louis Basdevant is unmasked as a turncoat, Matard forces him at gunpoint to get him into a heavily guarded town. When the masquerade is uncovered, Matard shoots Basdevant and a German officer, and escapes by jumping in the harbor. He sees a U-boat entering a hidden pen.

He gives a coded message to Plehec (William Edmunds) to transmit on his wireless, but the man is caught. Matard is also taken. Though a number of civilians refuse to betray Matard (and are subsequently shot), Plehec's young nephew Etienne (Darryl Hickman) identifies him. When Matard refuses to tell Captain Hans Holz (George Coulouris) the location of the wireless, he is tortured for days. Schoolteacher and Resistance member Jean Kerenor (Richard Whorf) and other villagers manage to free him.

Hidden in a secret room beneath the church, Matard is nursed back to health by Anne Pinot. Knowing his true identity, she admits she loves him, much to his delight. Etienne shows up, telling Matard that his uncle had instructed him to do whatever he had to in order to protect the wireless. The boy takes Matard to it; Matard sends the location to his superiors.

A commando raid is organized, led by Colonel Trane (Reginald Owen). On the way to rendezvous with the British, Matard and Kerenor stumble upon Elise and Holz in each other's arms. Furious that he had defended Elise from the charge of collaboration all this time, Kerenor kills them both. After they depart, Madame Corlay arrives, attracted by the sound of gunfire. When she hears German soldiers approach, she grabs the pistol and allows herself to be captured to shield the others.

Matard joins some of the soldiers in the assault on the control room. Becoming trapped inside, they are rescued by Kerenor, who attacks the Germans from behind. Though he is killed, the others succeed in blowing up the sub pens. The commandos re-embark on their boats. Aboard, Matard finds Anne and Etienne.

Cast

 Jean-Pierre Aumont as Capt. Pierre Matard / Bertrand Corlay 
 Susan Peters as Anne Pinot
 Margaret Wycherly as Mme. Henriette Corlay
 Signe Hasso as Elise
 Richard Whorf as Jean Kerenor
 George Coulouris as Capt. Hans Holz
 John Emery as Capt. Deichgraber
 Darryl Hickman as Etienne
 Sarah Padden as Albertine
 Adia Kuznetzoff as Louis Basdevant
 Reginald Owen as Col. Trane
 Miles Mander as Col. Herman Fournier
 Alan Napier as Sam Wells
 Odette Myrtil as Louis' sister
 Juanita Quigley as Jeannine
 William Edmunds as Plehec

Production
The working title for Assignment in Brittany was Fire in the Night.

Reception
The New York Times described the film as "an ordinary box-office adventure whose pretensions fall flat."

References
Notes

External links
 
 
 
 

1943 films
American black-and-white films
American war films
Films about the French Resistance
Films based on American novels
Films directed by Jack Conway
Films scored by Lennie Hayton
Films set in France
Metro-Goldwyn-Mayer films
World War II films made in wartime
Films based on works by Helen MacInnes
1943 war films
1940s English-language films